Edremit, is a district in the Van Province of Turkey.

Government 
Gülcan Kaçmaz Sayyiğit from the Peoples' Democratic Party (HDP) was elected mayor at the local elections in March 2019. In September 2019 five council members of the HDP were dismissed and replaced with trustees. The Kaymakam is Muhammet Fuat Türkman.

Etymology 
The current name of Edremit derives from the Armenian name Artamet, which literally means "Near the Fields" in Armenian, as it lies near the fields of grape and apple trees on the coastline of lake Van. The Greek name for Edremit is Adramyttion (Άδραμύττιον, Latin: Adramyttium). Greeks connect this name with the ancient Greek goddess Artemis. In pre-Christian times, there was a temple in the area dedicated to the goddess Anahit, who was sometimes identified with Artemis.

History 

The town's foundation predates the Christian era. It was founded as a small town at the shores of Lake Van in Tosp district of Vaspurakan province lying in the middle of Historical Armenia. In the course of history, the city has had several names: Artemida, Zard, Artashessyan, Avan, Artavanyan and now - Edremit.

In the time of the Urartian Kingdom, the Edremit gardens were irrigated by the Menua Canal and known to be fertile. The settlement served as a summer residence for the Armenian kings of antiquity.

In the 10th century Artamet had a population of 12,000. It was especially renowned for its apple orchards, and was said to produce the best apples in all Armenia.
 
At the beginning of the 19th century Artamet had approximately 500 houses, 435 of which were Armenian, and 65 Turkish. After the Hamidian Massacres of 1894–1896, the number of Turkish families increased to 400, while the number of Armenian families decreased to 200.

Shortly before the Armenian genocide, the Armenians of the settlement lived mainly in central part of Artamet, while the Turks settled near peripheral gardens and fields. Before 1915, Artamet had 10 Armenian churches and 1 Greek church. Armenians, Greeks, Assyrians and other local Christians were almost entirely destroyed by Turks during the Armenian genocide, although some of the Armenians managed to flee to Eastern Armenia.  After the massacre of the local Christians, thousands of their historical monuments were annihilated as well.

The events of Artamet in 1915 are described in the book Four Years Beneath the Crescent by Venezuelan writer and soldier Raphael de Nogales.

Earthquake

On the 9 November 2011 an earthquake of the magnitude of 5.9 Mw occurred in Edremit.

References

Towns in Turkey
Western Armenia
Populated places in Van Province
Districts of Van Province
Kurdish settlements in Turkey